Sadaf Taherian (born July 21, 1988) is an Iranian model and former actress. She has had appearances in Iranian movies and television. After leaving the country, Taherian posted unveiled images of herself on Facebook and Instagram that were denounced by Iran's ministry of culture and Islamic guidance.

Taherian started her modeling career after leaving Iran. She works with cosmetics, beauty and healthcare companies in countries including Turkey and the UAE. She is fluent in Persian, Turkish and English.

Career

Acting career 
Taherian began her professional acting career with a role in the film Nobody, Nowhere (2011) (fa). She followed it with another roles in four television series, including Woodpecker (2011) and Like a Dream (2012).

Removing the Hijab 
In October 2015, Sadaf Taherian posted uncovered photos of herself on Instagram and Facebook in protest at being forced to wear a headscarf, and said she will speak out about the "dirty cinema of Iran". She has also posted videos on her Instagram account, saying that she had left the country for nearby Dubai and her account was not hacked.

Iran’s law deems hijab mandatory for women since the establishment of the Islamic Republic in 1979. In reaction to Taherian's act, the ministry of culture and Islamic guidance denounced her ‘immoral’, banned her from acting, and photoshopped the traditional head scarf back into the shots.

Modeling career 

She started her modeling career after leaving Iran. She worked with cosmetics, beauty and health care companies as model. In 2016, Watsons, that known as the largest health care and beauty care chain store in Asia, worked with Taherian for beauty and health products. Her images are used in many beauty and fashion magazines, but not in her native country. She has also been involved in several fashion promotional videos.

Personal life 
After leaving Iran, Taherian began a relationship with Turkish actor Özgür Teke.

Filmography
Cinema
 Hich Koja, Hich Kas (Nobody, Nowhere) (2011)
 Pas Kuche-haye Shemrun (Shemiran's Back alleys) (2012)
 Gharar-e Baadi, Hamān Ja (Next Date, Same Place) (2013)
 Asr-e Yakhbandan (Ice Age) (2015)

TV
 Telefon-e Hamrah (Cellular Phone) (2011)
 Darkub (Woodpecker) (2011)
 Mesl-e Yek Khab (Like a Dream) (2012)

Short
 Filmi Kutah Baray-e Hamsaram (Short Movie for my spouse) (2010)

References

External links

 

1988 births
Living people
People from Tehran
Actresses from Tehran
Iranian female models
Iranian film actresses
Iranian television actresses
21st-century Iranian actresses